Edward Pugh may refer to:
 Edward Pugh (bishop), Church of England bishop
 Edward Pugh (artist), Welsh artist
 Edward Pugh (author), pen name David Hughson, writer on the topography and history of London
 Edward W. Pugh, member of the Kansas State Legislature
 Teddy Pugh, Welsh gymnast